Cross-country skiing at the 2022 Winter Olympics was held at the Kuyangshu Nordic Center and Biathlon Center in Zhangjiakou, China.

A total of 296 quota spots (148 per gender) were distributed to the sport, a decline of 14 from the 2018 Winter Olympics. A total of 12 events were contested, six each for men and women.

Qualification

A maximum of 296 quota spots will be available to athletes to compete at the games. A maximum of 16 athletes can be entered by a National Olympic Committee, with a maximum of 8 men or 8 women.  Nations that have an athlete achieve less than 300 FIS points in the 2021 World Championships, or the under 23 World Championships, gain entry for at least one competitor, of that gender, into the 2022 games.

Competition schedule
The following was the competition schedule for all twelve events.

All times are (UTC+8).

Medal summary

Medal table

Men's events

This event was shortened to 28.4 km due to high winds and freezing temperatures.

Women's events

Participating nations
A total of 296 athletes from 52 nations (including the ROC) were scheduled to participate, with the numbers of athletes are shown in parentheses.

References

External links
Official Results Book – Cross-country Skiing

2022 Winter Olympics
2022 Winter Olympics events
Cross-country skiing at the 2022 Winter Olympics